Emmanuel Ralph Kotei Nikoi (born 16 December 1984), known by the stage name Okra Tom Dawidi or Da Kasaharilist, is a Ghanaian hiplife musician, best known for his debut hit single “Ayekoo”, which features Obrafour and Tinny.

Early life and education 
Okra, the third of three children, was born in La, Accra on the 16th of December 1984 to Mrs. Grace Kaaley Amarh, a trader, and Mr. Vincent Nikoi Kotey, former chief supply officer of the Electoral Commission of Ghana. He attended St. John's Preparatory and Junior High school in Achimota. He then proceeded to the Accra Technical Training Center. Okra Tom had always wanted to be an engineer and a professional musician.

Music career 
Okra Tom Dawidi was first introduced to Hammer of the Last Two by a friend, where the two worked on songs such as Ayekoo, Donto among others. He was featured on the Execution Diary album in 2003. He is noted for his unique style of storytelling.

He has collaborated with several artistes, such as Sarkodie, Kwaw Kese, Tinny, Obrafour, Kwabena Kwabena, Reggie Rockstone among others. Okra has constantly been featured in the Ghanaian animated series, Tales of Nazir.

Videography

Discography

Singles

References

External links 

Living people
Ghanaian rappers
1984 births